Neacanista is a genus of beetles in the family Cerambycidae, containing the following species:

 Neacanista shirakii (Mitono, 1943)
 Neacanista tuberculipenne Gressitt, 1940

References

Acanthocinini